Mrozy may refer to the following places:
Mrozy, Mińsk County in Masovian Voivodeship (east-central Poland)
Mrozy, Żyrardów County in Masovian Voivodeship (east-central Poland)
Mrozy, Pomeranian Voivodeship (north Poland)